

The Charaxinae, the leafwings, are a nymphalid subfamily of butterflies that includes about 400 species, inhabiting mainly the tropics, although some species extend into temperate regions in North America, Europe, China, and southern Australia. Significant variations exist between the species. For example, some are medium sized and bright orange above, but mottled gray or brown below. This underwing coloration helps them resemble a dead leaf when they are at rest, as they keep their wings closed. With relatively few exceptions, the hindwings of the members of this subfamily have jagged edges.

Adults are very robust and fast flyers, and many are strongly attracted to drink liquids from carrion, dung, and rotten fruits, rather than nectar from flowers.

Males establish territories and perch on tree trunks, branches, and even the ground. The eggs are smooth and round and generally with a somewhat concave apex.

Some genera in this subfamily (notably Charaxes, Agrias, and Prepona) are very popular among butterfly collectors.

Genera
Tribe Charaxini Guenée, 1865
 Polyura – nawabs
 Charaxes – rajahs and pashas, emperors

Tribe Euxanthini Rydon, 1971  
 Euxanthe

Tribe Pallini Rydon, 1971
 Palla

Tribe Prothoini Roepke, 1938
 Prothoe
 Agatasa – glorious begum

Tribe Preponini Rydon, 1971
 Agrias
 Prepona
 Archaeoprepona
 Anaeomorpha (sometimes in Anaeini)

Tribe Anaeini (also see tribe article)
 Anaea
 Coenophlebia
 Consul
 Fountainea
 Hypna
 Memphis (formerly included in Anaea)
 Polygrapha
 Siderone
 Zaretis

References

External links

Checklist of North American Nymphalidae

 
-
Taxa named by William Doherty
Butterfly subfamilies